Denys Molchanov and Igor Zelenay were the defending champions and successfully defended their title, defeating Tomislav Brkić and Tomislav Draganja 7–6(7–1), 6–4 in the final.

Seeds

Draw

References

External links
 Main draw

Open Città della Disfida - Doubles
2019 Doubles